Marcus' method (also referred to as Marcus's method and Method of Marcus) is a structural analysis method which was designed to design concrete slabs with rectangular, orthogonal shapes. It represents an adaptation of the strip method. It is based on elastic analysis of torsionally restrained two-way rectangular slabs with a uniformly distributed load.

Marcus introduced a correction factor (reduction factor rather) to the existing Rankine Grashoff theory in order to account for the torsional restraints at the corners.

See also
 Grashof and Rankine method

References

Structural analysis